Hayrapetyan or in Western Armenian Հայրապետեան pronounced Hairabedian is an Armenian surname. It is also transliterated as Hayrapetian, Hairapetyan, Hairapetian, Ayrapetyan, Airapetyan or Airapetian and may refer to:

Aram Ayrapetyan (born 1986), Russian-Armenian football player 
Arsen Ayrapetyan (born 1997), Russian football player 
Arshak Hayrapetyan (born 1978), Armenian sport wrestler
David Ayrapetyan (born 1983), Russian-Armenian amateur boxer
Eduard Hayrapetyan (born 1949), Armenian composer
Levon Hayrapetyan (born 1989), Armenian footballer
Luara Hayrapetyan (born 1997), Armenian singer
Sarkis Hayrapetyan (born 1992), Armenian figure skater
Slavik Hayrapetyan (born 1996), Armenian figure skater
Sos Hayrapetyan (born 1959), Armenian Soviet field hockey player

Armenian-language surnames